Fusarium sulphureum is a fungal plant pathogen infecting maize and hemp.

References

sulphureum
Fungal plant pathogens and diseases
Maize diseases
Hemp diseases
Fungi described in 1824